Puelén Department is a department of Argentina in La Pampa Province.  The capital city of the department is Veinticinco de Mayo.

References

External links

Departments of La Pampa Province